Lazare Adingono (or Lazare Adie Ngono; born 11 January 1978) is a Cameroonian-American former basketball player and current head coach of Primeiro de Agosto of the Angolan Basketball League.

Playing career
Adingono played basketball at the University of Rhode Island from 1999 to 2003. In the 2002–03 season, Adingono was a co-captain and finished third on the team in scoring, with 11.8 points per game. He also was a member of the Cameroon national basketball team.

Coaching career
Adingono coached the men's national team at the 2007 and 2009 FIBA Africa Championships. From 2006 to 2009, Adingono was an assistant coach for the Canisius Golden Griffins. In April 2009, Adingono left Canisius.

Adingono is an uncle of team Cameroon and Petro Atlético player Parfait Bitee.

From May 2012 until September 2020, Adingono was the head coach of Angolan side Petro Atlético. With Petro, he won one African continental title and two league titles.

He coached his native country again during the AfroBasket 2021 qualifiers.

In spring 2021, he signed as head coach of Cameroonian club FAP Basketball ahead of the 2021 BAL season.

On 17 June 2022, Primeiro de Agosto announced Adingono signed a two-year contract to become the club's head coach.

Honours

As coach 
Petro de Luanda
2x Angolan Basketball League: (2014–15, 2018–19)
2x Taça de Angola: (2013, 2014)
FIBA Africa Clubs Champions Cup: (2015)

References

1978 births
Living people
Cameroonian men's basketball players
Cameroonian basketball coaches
Cameroonian expatriate basketball people in the United States
Canisius Golden Griffins men's basketball coaches
Rhode Island Rams men's basketball players
Point guards
Basketball players from Yaoundé
Atlético Petróleos de Luanda (basketball) coaches
Basketball Africa League coaches